Cyclone Davis may refer to:

 Emmett Smith "Cyclone" Davis (1918–2015), United States Air Force officer and pilot
 James "Cyclone" Davis (1853–1940), American politician

See also
 Storm Davis (born 1961), American baseball player